Dorcadion scabricolle is a species of beetle in the family Cerambycidae. It was described by Dalman in 1817. It is known from Azerbaijan, Iran, Armenia, and Turkey.

Subspecies
 Dorcadion scabricolle balikesirense Breuning, 1962
 Dorcadion scabricolle caramanicum Daniel, 1903
 Dorcadion scabricolle crassofasciatum Özdikmen, 2013
 Dorcadion scabricolle nakhicevanum Danilevsky, 1999
 Dorcadion scabricolle paiz Danilevsky, 1999
 Dorcadion scabricolle paphlagonicum Breuning, 1962
 Dorcadion scabricolle scabricolle Dalman, 1817
 Dorcadion scabricolle sevangense Reitter, 1889
 Dorcadion scabricolle skoupyi Lazarev, 2013
 Dorcadion scabricolle uludaghicum Breuning, 1970
 Dorcadion scabricolle salhanum Lazarev, 2020
 Dorcadion scabricolle lazistanum Lazarev, 2020

See also 
Dorcadion

References

scabricolle
Beetles described in 1817